Fallen Astronaut is a  aluminum sculpture created by Belgian artist Paul Van Hoeydonck. It is a stylized figure of an astronaut in a spacesuit, intended to commemorate the astronauts and cosmonauts who have died in the advancement of space exploration. It was commissioned and placed on the Moon by the crew of Apollo 15 at Hadley Rille on August 2, 1971 UTC, next to a plaque listing 14 names of those who died up to that time. The statue lies on the ground among several footprints.

The crew kept the memorial's existence a secret until after completion of their mission. After public disclosure, the National Air and Space Museum requested a replica of the statue. Controversy soon followed, as Van Hoeydonck claimed a different understanding of the agreement made with the astronauts and attempted to sell up to 950 copies of the statue. He finally relented under pressure from NASA, which had a strict policy against commercial exploitation of the US government space program.

Commission

Prior to his Apollo 15 lunar mission, astronaut David Scott met Belgian painter and printmaker Paul Van Hoeydonck at a dinner party. They agreed that Van Hoeydonck would create a small statuette for Scott to place on the Moon, though their recollections of the details differ. Scott's purpose was to commemorate those astronauts and cosmonauts who had died in the furtherance of space exploration, and he designed and separately made a plaque listing 14 American and Soviet names. Van Hoeydonck was given a set of design specifications: the sculpture was to be lightweight but sturdy, capable of withstanding the temperature extremes of the Moon; it could not be identifiably male or female, nor of any identifiable ethnic group. According to Scott, it was agreed Van Hoeydonck's name would not be made public, to avoid the commercial exploitation of the US government's space program.  Scott got permission from top NASA management prior to the mission to take the statue aboard his spacecraft, but did not disclose it publicly until a post-mission press conference.

Van Hoeydonck gives a different account of the agreement: according to an interview in Belgian newspaper Le Soir, the statue was supposed to be a representation of all mankind, not only fallen astronauts or cosmonauts.  He claimed he did not know the statue would be used as a memorial for the fallen space-goers, and the name given to the work was neither chosen nor approved by him; he had intended the figure to be left standing upright.  He also denies it was agreed he would remain anonymous.  Both his and Scott's versions of events are given in an article in Slate magazine in 2013.

Placement on the Moon
Astronaut David Scott secretly placed the Fallen Astronaut statue on the Moon during the Apollo 15 mission, near the completion of his work on August 2, 1971, along with a plaque bearing the names of eight American astronauts and six Soviet cosmonauts who had died in service:

Scott photographed the memorial but waited for a post-mission press conference to publicly disclose its existence. He noted, "Sadly, two names are missing, those of Valentin Bondarenko and Grigori Nelyubov." He explained that the western world was unaware of their deaths because of the secrecy surrounding the Soviet space program at the time. Also missing was Robert Henry Lawrence Jr., the first black astronaut and a U.S. Air Force officer selected for the Manned Orbiting Laboratory program who was killed in a training accident in 1967.

Controversy

The crew disclosed the statuette's existence during their press conference, and the National Air and Space Museum requested that a replica be made for public display. The crew agreed on the condition that it be displayed "with good taste and without publicity".  They gave the replica to the Smithsonian Institution on April 17, 1972, the day after CBS anchorman Walter Cronkite referred to the Fallen Astronaut and plaque as the first art installation on the Moon during the broadcast of the Apollo 16 launch.

In May 1972, Scott learned that Van Hoeydonck planned to make and sell more replicas. He believed that this would be a violation of the spirit of their agreement and of NASA's policy against commercial exploitation of the space program, and he tried to persuade Van Hoeydonck to refrain. Van Hoeydonck placed a full-page advertisement in the July 1972 issue of Art in America magazine offering 950 replicas of Fallen Astronaut signed by the sculptor, sold by the Waddell Gallery of New York for $750 each, a second edition at a lower, unspecified price, and a catalog edition at $5. Van Hoeydonck retracted his permission for the replicas after receiving complaints from NASA, but not before one was sold. Using a box numbered 200/950 and prepared for the limited edition, a sample figure was sold to a Morgan Stanley investment banker who collected space artifacts and works of art. The sale was verified by Van Hoeydonck following an investigation that began in 2015 when the piece in question surfaced on eBay. It was bought by a collector living in the UK.

On September 11, 2007, art journalist Jan Stalmans wrote to Van Hoeydonck, asking him how many replicas were in existence. Van Hoeydonck returned a handwritten response on the letter that 50 copies had been made, most of which were still in his possession unsigned.

Replicas 
In January 2019, Van Hoeydonck and Apollo 15 Command Module Pilot Al Worden announced the sale of a limited edition replica inside a blue acrylic block, as Van Hoeydonck originally intended, which would have allowed the statue to be placed upright on the Moon to "symbolize humanity rising" via space travel. NASA had rejected the acrylic enclosure's inclusion on the flight as a fire hazard. A smaller number of enlarged sculptures are also to be sold.

See also 
 List of artificial objects on the Moon
 List of spaceflight-related accidents and incidents
 List of extraterrestrial memorials
 Space Mirror Memorial

References
Specific

General

External links

 Sculpture fabricated at Milgo / Bufkin
 Transcript of NASA News Release 72-189 (September 15, 1972), describing the origin of Fallen Astronaut and the subsequent controversy
 Slate article "Sculpture on the Moon"
 Official NASA photo of Fallen Astronaut on the Moon
 Apollo 15 Lunar Surface Journal
 Observatoire du Land Art (transcript of the book Goden & Astronaut, Banana Press, 1972 (statement, articles, photos))
 Von Hoeydonck's website
 Paul Van Hoeydonck works at Whitford Fine Art
 See some works of Paul Van Hoeydonck

1971 sculptures
Aluminium sculptures
Apollo 1
Apollo 15
Artifacts in the collection of the Smithsonian Institution
Death in art
Exploration of the Moon
Message artifacts
Monuments and memorials
Monuments and memorials to explorers
Outdoor sculptures
Posthumous recognitions
Monuments and memorials to Yuri Gagarin
David Scott
Gus Grissom
Ed White (astronaut)
1971 on the Moon